.abc is the name of several file extensions:

 .abc (ActionScript), or ActionScript Byte Code, used in virtual machines
 .abc (Alembic), a computer graphics file format
 .abc (Clean), an intermediate compiling language used in Clean
 .abc (music notation), a language for notating music using ASCII characters

See also
 ABC (disambiguation)